Doridomorpha is a genus of sea slugs, arminoid nudibranchs, marine gastropod mollusks in the family Doridomorphidae.

Taxonomy
The phylogenetic position of Doridomorpha was clarified in  2020 as a result of an integrative taxonomic study of the family Tritoniidae. An interesting finding was that Doridomorpha, Doridoxa and Heterodoris cluster with the family Arminidae, in a molecular tree within the Dendronotoidea.

Species

There is only one species within the genus Doridomorpha:

Doridomorpha gardineri is a small, thin nudibranch which is occasionally found on the coral Heliopora.

References

 Doridomorphidae